"Cookies &" was a brand of cookie treats from the parent company Mars, Incorporated. In the United Kingdom, Ireland, Australia and the Netherlands, Cookies & was sold as "Bisc &".
It consists of cookies coated in chocolate with added toppings (i.e. M&M's, Snickers, Milky Way, and Twix.) "Cookies &" were introduced in 2002
to appeal to the 18–46 years old target market.

Discontinued 
Cookies & joined a number of confectionery items discontinued by Mars, Incorporated shortly after disappointing
sales, though the product did develop something of a cult following. The Cookies/Bisc & M&M's and Cookies/Bisc & Twix varieties are still sold in France as "M&M's Biscuit" and "Twix Top".

References

See also
M&M's
Snickers
Milky Way (chocolate bar)
Twix

Brand name cookies
Mars confectionery brands